= Someone Was Watching =

1993 book by David Patneaude

- Cover art by Paul Micich (1993)
- Author: David Patneaude
- Language: English
- Genre: Children's novel
- Publisher: Albert Whitman and Company
- Publication date: 1993
- Publication place: United States
- Media type: Print (Hardcover and Paperback)
- Pages: 224 pp
- ISBN: 0-8075-7531-3

Someone Was Watching is a 1993 novel written by David Patneaude about a boy who believes his missing little sister didn't actually drown in a river, but was kidnapped.

== Plot summary ==
After taking a family trip to their summer cabin for Memorial Day Weekend, 13-year-old Chris Barton is supposed to be watching his 3-year-old sister, Molly. However, he wanders away for a few minutes to film scenery with his video camera, and eventually falls asleep. When he wakes up, he quickly returns to where he last saw Molly, only to find that his parents have also fallen asleep and his sister is nowhere to be found.

When her coloring book is found at the end of a nearby dock, it is believed that the little girl has fallen into the river drowned. Days of searching turn up nothing, and many assume that Molly's body was pulled too far downstream and is lost.

Six months later, Chris makes a discovery on his video camera that may prove Molly didn't drown in the river that day. He instead believes that she was kidnapped and may still be alive. With the help of his best friend, Pat, the two set off on a journey from Wisconsin to Florida to discover the truth.

== Film ==
The novel was made into a film in 2002 starring Jonathan Rudy, Ben Watson, and Chanise McClure and directed by Mark Goodman. Instead of travelling to Florida to find Molly, the boys travel to New Mexico. The film received mixed reviews.
